Love Songs is the third compilation album by American R&B girl group Destiny's Child, released on January 25, 2013 through Columbia Records. The album differs from their first two compilations in that it features mostly album-only selections as well as the newly recorded song "Nuclear", the first original song from Destiny's Child since the group disbanded in 2005. The album cover is based on the single artwork from the band's 2004 single "Lose My Breath".

Development

Destiny's Child was formed in Houston, Texas in 1990, and its final line-up consisting of Beyoncé Knowles, Kelly Rowland and Michelle Williams dismantled in 2005. Their reunion was rumored over the years. In July 2012, Mathew Knowles, Beyoncé's father and the group's manager, confirmed that Destiny's Child still have their joint venture with Sony Music and would be releasing two "records with new material". The first was Playlist: The Very Best of Destiny's Child, which was released in October 2012. Knowles announced via her official website on January 10, 2013, that a compilation featuring new music entitled Love Songs, which would be the group's first album in over eight years, would be released. She posted its official artwork, "I am so proud to announce the first original Destiny's Child music in eight years." It contains one new song entitled "Nuclear", which was produced by Pharrell Williams.

Apart from "Nuclear", the rest of the album consists of assorted previously recorded music, which Knowles, Rowland and Williams handpicked. Williams said that Love Songs was made "for the fans", and told MTV News about recording the "Nuclear" track, "It was a bunch of fun. It was just picking up right where we left off. The harmonies and just us stacking [vocals] ... Beyoncé laid hers first, then I'd go and lay another note to the bottom, and I'm like, 'Wow, this is dope.' I literally got goose bumps." In an interview with German web show MalcolmMusic, commenting her contribution to the song as a songwriter, Michelle Williams revealed that Pharrell had already written the verses for Rowland and Knowles, and that Knowles urged Michelle to write her own bridge.

Critical response

Upon its release, the public reaction to "Nuclear" was mixed. According to MTV News, "Those saying "no, no, no" called it too mid-tempo, underwhelming even, for an act that built its catalog on power anthems like "Survivor." But supporters fell hard for the drum-heavy Pharrell production." Consequence of Sound's Amanda Koellner gave Love Songs a mixed review, noting that its material highlights "the group’s knack for harmony and emotion" and it is "a shot of nostalgia", but isn't an "essential collection". Sarah Rodman of The Boston Globe was displeased with the lack of new material, calling the album "unnecessary" in the "digital world of playlist-making". Although, Rodman did praise "Nuclear" as a "modestly appealing trifle that features quasi-scientific nonsense about 'when two become one on a quantum level' and benefits from all the slow jam somnambulance preceding it by being slightly more alert."

Jim Farber of the New York Daily News said the album's ballads which "didn't flatter Destiny's core persona" sounded like "extended runs rather than fully honed tunes." Farber, who had given the album an overall score of three out of five stars, went on to praise their "rich" vocal performances, writing "the way the voices of Kelly Rowland and Michelle Williams wrap around Beyoncé’s — encouraging ever higher flights, while jazzing up each other’s runs — proves this wasn’t just a one-woman show".

Andy Kellman of Allmusic described the collection as "a sharp selection of deep album cuts, including one from Kelly Rowland's Simply Deep ("Heaven"), that demonstrates the group's depth behind the hits". Kellman gave particular praise to "Nuclear", calling it a "knockout" and writing, "it sounds more like something released in 1990 by the Chimes, Soul II Soul, or the Family Stand than any pop-R&B circa 2013".

Chart performance
In the United States, the album debuted at number seventy-two on the Billboard 200 the chart issue dated February 16, 2013. The album sold 6,000 copies in the first week of release. In its second week the album dropped to number one-hundred and twenty-two. In its third week the album dropped to one-hundred and fifty-one. The album spent a total of four weeks on the Billboard 200 Albums chart with its final chart at number one-hundred and sixty-six. The album also debuted at number seven on the R&B Albums chart and number fourteen on the Top R&B/Hip-Hop Albums chart.

In the United Kingdom, the album debuted at number forty-four on the UK Albums Chart and number three on the UK R&B Albums Chart on February 10, 2013. In Ireland, the compilation debuted at number twenty-seven on the Irish Albums Chart for the week ending February 7, 2013. Across other European countries, the album peaked within the top one-hundred in Italy and Switzerland. The album charted at number one-hundred and forty-nine in France.

In Australia the album charted at number sixty-nine on the Australian Albums Chart and number fourteen on the Australian Urban Albums Chart.

Track listing

Charts

Release history

References

External links
Destiny's Child's official website

2013 compilation albums
Destiny's Child albums
Albums produced by Pharrell Williams
Albums with cover art by Tony Duran